John Johnstone (28 April 1734 – 10 December 1795) was a Scottish nabob,
a corrupt official of the British East India Company who returned home with great wealth. Described as "a shrewd and unscrupulous business man",
he survived several scandals and became a major landowner when he returned to Scotland in 1765.

Johnstone sat in the House of Commons of Great Britain from 1774 to 1780, having bribed his way to a victory in the Dysart Burghs.

Early life and family 

Johnstone was born in Edinburgh, the fifth son of Sir James Johnstone, 3rd Baronet (1697–1772) and his wife, Barbara (died 1773), daughter of Alexander Murray, 4th Lord Elibank.
The Jacobite plotter Alexander Murray of Elibank was his uncle.

His brothers included the British Army officer and politician Sir James Johnstone, 4th Baronet (1726–1794), the wealthy lawyer and politician William (later Sir William Pulteney, 5th Baronet (1729–1805), and the politician and Royal Navy officer George Johnstone (1730–1787).
Another brother, Patrick, died in the Black Hole of Calcutta.

In 1765 Johnstone married Elizabeth Caroline Keene, daughter of a Colonel Keene from Northamptonshire, and niece of the diplomat Sir Benjamin Keene. They had one son and daughter. His daughter, Ann Elizabeth (b. 1776, d. 1851) married James Gordon of Craig. His son, James Raymond Johnstone of Alva, married Mary Elizabeth Cholmeley (b. c 1778, d. 9 Sep 1843).

The family became very powerful, and it was claimed that by the late 1750s they were "involved in every major event in the British Empire".

Career

India 
Johnstone went to Bengal in 1751, as a writer for the East India Company. He was at Dacca in 1756 when conflict broke out and was taken prisoner. After his release, emboldened by the death of his brother Patrick, he volunteered to join the company's military forces under Robert Clive for the Battle of Plassey, and saw further military service before resuming civilian work in 1757.

In about 1760 Johnstone was placed in charge of the company's affairs in Midnapore, and became a member of the Bengal Council.  His success there led to a transfer in 1762 to Burdwan, where he developed private businesses which led to conflict with Henry Vansittart, the Governor of Bengal. This led to Johnstone being dismissed by the Company in early 1764, but the company's Court of Directors overturned the decision on 21 March 1764, and he was reinstated by May.

Johnstone's former ally Robert Clive did not support Johnstone's return to his post, and when Clive succeeded Vansittart as governor in 1765 he began an inquiry into gifts totalling over £50,000 which Johnstone had secured from the new Nawab of Bengal, Najimuddin Ali Khan.

In 1764, the Company had adopted new regulations which required its officers to sign a covenant that they would accept non-trivial gifts only with the prior approval of the directors.
Clive forced the resignation of Johnstone, who sailed for Britain in October 1765
with a fortune estimated at £300,000
(equivalent to £ in ).

Aged 31, Johnstone proceeded to buy estates in Scotland, first at Alva in Stirlingshire, and later in Selkirkshire and Dumfriesshire.

Scotland 

The Johnstone family account says that he spent "about a ninth" of his money on the estates at Alva, Hanginghaw and Denovan, and "lived quietly" there until his election to Parliament.
However his letters to his brother William reveal that he continued to engage in speculation and stock manipulation.

Meanwhile, the directors of the East India Company moved to prosecute Johnstone for his actions.
His allies, led by George Dempster, lobbied on his behalf and in his defence Johnstone published in 1766 "A letter to the proprietors of East-India stock", subtitled "Vindication of His Conduct in Receiving Presents from the Native Governments of India".
In May 1767, the General Court of the East India Company over-ruled its directors, and dropped all prosecutions against its former servants, and Johnstone walked free.

The following year, at the 1768 general election, Johnstone contested the parliamentary borough of Haslemere in Surrey, where he was defeated.

At the next election, in 1774 Johnstone used guile and money to win the seat of Dysart Burghs, which consisted of five burghs in the county of Fife: Kirkcaldy, Burntisland, Kinghorn, and Dysart. The Caledonian Mercury reported on 2 November 1774 that Johnstone did not declare his interest until after the burghs had chosen their delegates, and caught the sitting MP James Oswald by surprise.  Johnstone won the support of Dysart, and bribed the backing of Burntisland and Kinghorn delegates, winning the seat.

However, at the 1780 election Johnstone lost the support of Burntisland to his opponent John Henderson, who won the seat on the casting vote of Kirkcaldy.

Death and legacy 

Johnstone died on 10 December 1795, aged 61, at home in Alva House,
which had been remodelled and expanded in 1789 to the designs of Robert Adam.

Adam's works also included a family mausoleum to house the remains of Johnstone and his wife Caroline in Alva churchyard.

His son James Raymond Johnstone (died 1830), had 8 children, of whom the eldest James Johnstone (1801–1888) was MP for Clackmannanshire and Kinross-shire.

Alva house remained in his family for over a century, and in 1890 it passed to his descendant Carolin Johnstone. She sold the surrounding estate to reduce her debts, but failed to clear them, and the house was abandoned by the 1920s. It was used for target practice during World War II, and left in ruins.

References

Bibliography

External links 
 Portrait of John Johnstone, Betty Johnstone and Miss Wedderburn

1734 births
1795 deaths
Members of the Parliament of Great Britain for Scottish constituencies
British MPs 1774–1780
British East India Company people
Younger sons of baronets
Scottish landowners
People from Clackmannanshire
Paintings by Henry Raeburn